The women's 1000 metres in short track speed skating at the 1998 Winter Olympics took place on 21 February at the White Ring.

Results

Heats
The first round was held on 21 February. There were eight heats, with the top two finishers moving on to the quarterfinals. In heat 5, the Netherlands' Anke Jannie Landman was advanced to the quarterfinals and China's Wang Chunlu was disqualified.

Heat 1

Heat 2

Heat 3

Heat 4

Heat 5

Heat 6

Heat 7

Heat 8

Quarterfinals
The quarterfinals were held on 21 February. The top two finishers in each of the four quarterfinals advanced to the semifinals.

Quarterfinal 1

Quarterfinal 2

Quarterfinal 3

Quarterfinal 4

Semifinals
The semifinals were held on 21 February. The top two finishers in each of the two semifinals qualified for the A final, while the third and fourth place skaters advanced to the B Final.

Semifinal 1

Semifinal 2

Finals
The four qualifying skaters competed in Final A, while four others raced for 5th place in Final B.

Final A

Final B

References

Women's short track speed skating at the 1998 Winter Olympics
Women's events at the 1998 Winter Olympics